USA vs AL-ARIAN is 2007 documentary film about Sami Al-Arian and his family during and after his federal trial on terrorism-related charges.  It was directed by the Norwegian director Line Halvorsen.

According to the St. Petersburg Times, the film "glosses over the specific charges, and pays scant attention to the evidence."  However Variety notes that, "Though unquestionably biased, eye-opening docu "USA vs Al-Arian" throws the spotlight on a justice system shanghaied by the Patriot Act, leaving a deeply sympathetic family frayed but not quite broken."

In the trial, the jury acquitted Al-Arian of nearly half the charges, and deadlocked on the remaining charges.  After the trial, Al-Arian pleaded guilty in 2006 to conspiracy to help a terrorist organization, the Palestinian Islamic Jihad.

Awards
Audience Award, 2007 Tromsø International Film Festival
Best Film, 2007 New Orleans Human Rights Film Festival, USA
Grand Prix (Flugeprisen), 2007 Norwegian Documentary Film Festival Volda
Honorary Mention, 2007 International Festival of Muslim Cinema "Golden Minbar", Russia
Best Nordic Documentary, 2007 Nordisk Panorama – 5 Cities Film Festival

References

External links
 
 
 
USA vs. Al-Arian
Norwegian Film Institute's English-language description of the film.

2007 films
2007 documentary films
Documentary films about terrorism
Norwegian documentary films
Documentary films about American politics
Documentary films about the Israeli–Palestinian conflict
2000s American films